David John Archer (born November 5, 1982) is an American football coach and former player. He is the head coach of Cornell Big Red football team. He became the head coach in January 2013. Archer was a three-year starter for the Big Red before graduating in 2005.  He spent six years as an assistant coach at his alma mater.  He was also an assistant coach at Fairleigh Dickinson–Florham in 2006.

In 2015 Archer was the youngest head college football coach in the country.

Head coaching record

References

External links
 Cornell profile

1982 births
Living people
American football offensive linemen
Cornell Big Red football coaches
Cornell Big Red football players
Fairleigh Dickinson–Florham Devils football coaches